Leo Randolph (born February 27, 1958) is an American former boxer, who won the Flyweight Gold medal at the 1976 Summer Olympics.

Amateur career
Randolph had a very good amateur career.  Randolph was a product of the Tacoma Boys Club amateur program, along with fellow Olympic Gold Medalist Sugar Ray Seales, and future world champions Rocky Lockridge and Johnny Bumphus. Randolph was trained as an amateur and professional by Joe Clough, the head trainer at the Tacoma Boys Club. In 1975 he was the National Golden Gloves Flyweight champion. He was a National AAU flyweight champion, and was the 1976 Olympic Flyweight Gold Medalist.

Leo Randolph's 1976 Montreal Olympic boxing results were as follows:
 1st round bye
 Defeated Massoudi Samatou (Togo) walkover
 Defeated Constantin Gruiescu (Romania) 4-1
 Defeated Davy Larmour (Ireland) 4-1
 Defeated Leszek Błażyński (Poland) 4-1
 Defeated Ramón Duvalón (Cuba) 3-2

Professional career
Randolph turned pro in 1978.  In 1980, with a record of 16-1, he challenged Ricardo Cardona for the WBA Super Bantamweight Title in a bout held in Seattle.  Randolph won via TKO in the 15th round.  In his next fight, he lost his title to Sergio Victor Palma via TKO in the 5th.  Randolph retired after the bout.
He currently holds the record for the earliest retirement ever by a former professional world boxing champion, and at two years and fifty days, Randolph also holds the record for the shortest career for any world boxing champion.

Randolph-Palma fight
After winning the World Boxing Association super bantamweight championship from Ricardo Cardona on May 4, 1980, Randolph made his first title defense versus Argentina's Sergio Palma three months later in Spokane, WA on August 9, 1980.  The bout was nationally televised.  Palma was not generally known to have an aggressive style or be a hard puncher, but he immediately went on the offensive from the opening bell.  Palma staggered Randolph early in the first round, staggered him again, and then floored the champion twice before the round ended.  Pressing his advantage, Palma dominated round two, clearly overwhelming the young champion.  Randolph rallied in both rounds three and four by boxing defensively, but Palma reasserted himself in round five.  Randolph was knocked down for the third time in the contest and rose on shaky legs. Referee Stanley Christodoulou counted beyond the mandatory eight count as Randolph stood groggily with his right hand draped over the top rope.  He stopped the fight at 1:12 of the round, ruling that Randolph was in no condition to continue. According to an article written by Jim Benagh in the November 1980 edition of The Ring magazine, Randolph, a deeply religious man, said he did not have the necessary killer instinct to continue as a professional boxer and voluntarily chose to retire from the ring at age 22.

Personal
Leo now resides in his hometown of Tacoma. After boxing, he started working for the Pierce Transit public bus company in 1988. He works as a Transit Operator and supervisor.

Honors
 2005 Inductee into the Tacoma-Pierce County Sports Hall of Fame

See also
List of super-bantamweight boxing champions

References
 July 3, 2006 Sports Illustrated, "A Flurry of Punch Lines" (for update)

External links

1958 births
Living people
Boxers from Washington (state)
Boxers at the 1976 Summer Olympics
Olympic boxers of the United States
Olympic gold medalists for the United States in boxing
Medalists at the 1976 Summer Olympics
Sportspeople from Tacoma, Washington
People from Columbus, Mississippi
Super-bantamweight boxers
World super-bantamweight boxing champions
World Boxing Association champions
Winners of the United States Championship for amateur boxers
American male boxers
African-American boxers
21st-century African-American people
20th-century African-American sportspeople